Keeper Hill or Slievekimalta is a mountain with a height of  in the Silvermine Mountains of County Tipperary, Ireland. Traditionally, it was deemed to be part of the Slieve Felim Mountains.

Name 
Keeper Hill, also known as Slievekimalta, gets its name from a little-known tale about Sadb, daughter of Conn of the Hundred Battles, raising her children Eogan and Indderb on this mountain after they had been rejected by their father Ailill Aulom, king of Munster.

Geography 
The mountain is about 15 km east of Limerick City. Keeper Hill is the highest mountain in the Silvermines (and the wider Shannon area) and the 58th highest in Ireland. There is a stone circle in Bauraglanna townland on the northeastern slopes, known as Firbrega ('false men').

Access to the summit 
There is a looped walk around the lower shoulders of Keeper Hill, to which the ‘hardy’ walker can add the ‘trek’ to the summit. This loop walk is part of the National Looped Walks and is marked using the standard purple National Looped Walk directional arrows. 

Historically, a Lughnasadh gathering was held on the summit each August.

Conservation
On the slopes of Keeper Hill is a woodland of 3,300 hectares, mostly of non-native conifers. The 300 hectare summit is blanket bog and Nardus
grassland, considered of ecological importance.
Keeper Hill is designated a Special Area of Conservation.

See also 
Lists of mountains in Ireland
List of mountains of the British Isles by height
List of P600 mountains in the British Isles
List of Marilyns in the British Isles
List of Hewitt mountains in England, Wales and Ireland

References

External links 
 

Marilyns of Ireland
Mountains and hills of County Tipperary
Mountains under 1000 metres
Special Areas of Conservation in the Republic of Ireland